Hockey League Simulator 2 (HLS2) is a 1992 ice hockey-themed sports game from Bethesda Softworks. The game is fully compatible with Wayne Gretzky Hockey 3.

Reception

Peter Freunscht from PC Games rated the game a 29 of 100 criticizing the poor sound and other issues.

Mika Nirvi from Pelit rated the game a 92 of 100 stating "The game comfort is good. The optimal mode of play is the combined mouse-keyboard combination. The direct-dial keys make the game easier and you can catch up quickly. The sounds and animation are top-notch and they create their own atmosphere in the game. The wide selection options and the ability to play HLS2 games keep Wayne Gretzky Hockey 3 as its hockey king".

References 

1992 video games
Bethesda Softworks games
DOS games
DOS-only games
Ice hockey video games
Sports management video games
Video games developed in the United States
Video game sequels